Ototó is a village in the central part of São Tomé Island in São Tomé and Príncipe. Its population is 585 (2012 census). It lies 1 km southeast of Santa Margarida and 1.2 km south of Madalena.

Population history

References

Populated places in Mé-Zóchi District